Kidal Airport  is an airstrip serving Kidal in Mali.

See also
Transport in Mali

References

 OurAirports - Mali
  Great Circle Mapper - Kidal
 Kidal
 Google Earth

External links

Airports in Mali